Medjugorje, a village in the south of Bosnia and Herzegovina, has been the site of alleged apparitions of the Blessed Virgin Mary since 24 June 1981. Various officials of the Catholic  Church have attempted to discern the validity of these Marian apparitions in order to provide guidance to potential devotees and pilgrims. On 7 December 2017, it was reported that Archbishop Hoser, Pope Francis' envoy to Medjugorje, announced that official pilgrimages are allowed, stating, "dioceses and other institutions can organize official pilgrimages." This pilgrimage was officially authorized by the Holy See in May 2019. The approval was not intended to signify recognition of the apparitions, but acknowledge the faith and pastoral needs of the pilgrims.

Background
When Bosnia and Herzegovina became part of Austria-Hungary, Pope Leo XIII took steps to establish dioceses (1881) and appoint local bishops. This included transferring parishes administered until then by the Franciscans to diocesan clergy. The friars resisted, and in the 1940s Franciscan provinces still controlled 63 of 79 parishes in the dioceses of Vrhbosna and Mostar. In the 1970s, friars in Herzegovina formed an association of priests to encourage popular opposition to diocesan parish takeovers. A 1975 decree by Pope Paul VI, Romanis Pontificibus, ordered that Franciscans to withdraw from most of the parishes in the Diocese of Mostar-Duvno, retaining 30 and leaving 52 to the diocesan clergy. In the 1980s the Franciscans still held 40 parishes under the direction of 80 friars.

On 24 June 1981, six children in the town of Medjugorje, Bosnia-Herzegovina (then part of Yugoslavia), said they had seen an apparition of the Blessed Virgin Mary and that these apparitions were continuing. The village began to attract pilgrims.

Local Ordinary

On 11 January 1982, Pavao Žanić, Bishop of Mostar, within whose jurisdiction Medjugorje lay, established a commission to look into the matter. When three days later, on 14 January 1982, three of the seers advised him that the "Madonna" supported the Franciscans, Bishop Zanic began to be concerned that they were being guided more by their Franciscan advisors than by the Blessed Virgin.

In 1984 Bishop Žanić decided to extend a first Commission to study the apparitions and expanded its membership to fifteen: 12 priests and 3 medical experts. They held seven meetings in all. This second commission completed its work in May 1986. Eleven members determined that the events at Medjugorje were Non constat de supernaturalitate (i.e., apparitions are neither approved nor condemned, but further study is needed to determine whether a supernatural character is present). The bishop duly informed the Bishops' Conference and the Holy See.

Yugoslav Bishops Conference
With the possible breakup of Yugoslavia, many Croat church leaders saw the new Marian cult in Herzegovina as both an aid to anti-communist efforts and a potential focus for Croat nationalism in both Croatia and Bosnia-Herzegovina. As the Medjugorje events had exceeded the scope of a local event, in January 1987, upon the suggestion of the Congregation for the Doctrine of the Faith, Cardinal Kuharić and Bishop Žanić made a joint communiqué in which they announced the formation of a third Commission under the direction of the Bishops Conference. The bishops would both review the work of the previous commissions and conduct its own inquiry. The Conference instructed that pilgrimages should not be organized to Medjugorje on the supposition of its being supernatural. In July Bishop Žanić forbade any priests who organized pilgrimages or came there ascribing a supernatural character to the events, to celebrate Mass in his diocese, and this until the Commission of the Bishops' Conference completed its inquiry.

The Bishops' Conference of Yugoslavia, at their spring meeting in Zadar on April 10, 1991, issued declaration stating in unequivocal ecclesiastical ruling that: "(o)n the basis of studies it cannot be affirmed that supernatural apparitions and revelations are occurring."

Holy See
In response to an inquiry from a French bishop, in March 1996 then Archbishop Tarcisio Bertone, Secretary of the Congregation for the Doctrine of the Faith under Cardinal Ratzinger, stated that official pilgrimages to Medjugorje, if presumed as a place of authentic Marian apparitions, are not permitted to be organized either on the parish or on the diocesan level. The following June, in response to reporters' questions, Joaquin Navarro-Valls, spokesman for Holy See Press Office, clarified that Archbishop Bertone was referring specifically to official pilgrimages. Catholic parishes and dioceses may not organize pilgrimages to Medjugorje, as that might give the impression of a canonical endorsement.

In 1993 Bishop Žanić retired at the age of 75 and was succeeded by his coadjutor, Bishop Ratko Perić. On 2 October 1997, Perić wrote:  that he was convinced that the events alleged at Medjugorje were no longer non constat de supernaturalitate (that their supernatural nature is not established) but constat de non supernaturalitate (it is not of a supernatural nature). In May 1998, in response to an inquiry from Bishop Gilbert Aubry, Bishop of Saint-Denis on Reunion Island, Archbishop Bertone cited the previous 1991 finding of non constat de supernaturalitate by the Yugoslav Bishops Conference, and noted that since the division of Yugoslavia, jurisdiction now lay with the Episcopal Conference of Bosnia-Herzegovina. Bishop Perić's statement must be considered the expression of the personal view of the Bishop of Mostar, who, as Ordinary of the place, always has the right to express what is, and remains, his personal opinion.

In 2009 Father Tomislav Vlasic, the former "spiritual director" to the six visionaries was laicised at his own request by Pope Benedict XVI a year after he was placed under investigation over allegations that he exaggerated the apparitions and had engaged in sexual relations with a nun. Vlasic was under formal investigation for alleged "dubious doctrine, the manipulation of consciences, suspect mysticism and disobedience towards legitimately issued orders". 
 
On 17 March 2010, the Holy See announced that, at the request of the bishops of Bosnia Herzegovina, it had established a commission, headed by Cardinal Camillo Ruini, to examine the Medjugorje phenomenon.

On 21 October 2013, the Apostolic Nunciature to the United States communicated, on behalf of the Congregation for the Doctrine of the Faith, that, in the light of the 1991 Zadar declaration about the Medjugorje events, Catholics, whether clergy or laypeople, "are not permitted to participate in meetings, conferences or public celebrations during which the credibility of such 'apparitions' would be taken for granted". The letter was sent to every diocese in the U.S. as Archbishop Müller of the CDF wanted the U.S. bishops to be aware that Ivan Dragicevic, one of the "so-called visionaries" of Medjugorje, was scheduled to give presentations at parishes across the country and was anticipated to have more apparitions during these talks. Because the commission established in 2010 was still in the process of its investigation, the CDF determined that the judgment of the Yugoslavian bishops which precluded such gatherings remain in force.

On 18 January 2014, the Holy See commission set up in 2010 to study the Medjugorje question was reported to have completed its work, the results of which it would communicate to the Congregation for the Doctrine of the Faith.

On 6 June 2015, Pope Francis, referring to the Congregation for the Doctrine of the Faith, told reporters "we've reached the point of making a decision and then they will say."

On 11 February 2017, Pope Francis named Bishop Henryk Hoser of Warszawa-Praga in Poland as his special envoy to Medjugorje, not to investigate the veracity of the apparitions but to evaluate the pastoral situation in Medjugorje and assess how the needs of pilgrims should best be met. Archbishop Hoser said "If Marian devotion has flourished in Medjugorje, if such multitudes arrive there, it is therefore a place where veneration will continue, since Our Lady can be venerated everywhere,..."

Prior to Hoser's review, pilgrimages to Medjugorje organized by official Church groups were discouraged, although people could make them privately or through pilgrimage tour groups. Having completed his assessment, Hoser announced that the previous impediment had been lifted. "The decree of the former episcopal conference of what used to be Yugoslavia, which, before the Balkan war, advised against pilgrimages in Medjugorje organized by bishops, is no longer relevant.  The Archbishop spoke favorably of the staff at the site. "I am full of admiration for the work the Franciscans are doing there," the Polish archbishop reported. "With a relatively small team—there is only a dozen of them—they do a huge job of welcoming pilgrims....Today, dioceses and other institutions can organize official pilgrimages. It's no longer a problem," explained Archbishop Hoser. Francis Cardinal Arinze observed that Mary has not appeared at every shrine dedicated to her, citing as an example the National Shrine of Our Lady of Aparecida in Brazil. "So it is a shrine, and whether she appeared there or not is a secondary question," he said. "She doesn't have to appear there to give grace."

Official position of the Church
Until such time as the Congregation for the Doctrine of the Faith releases its findings, the 1991 determination of the Yugoslav Bishops Conference  of non constat de supernaturalitate ("It is undetermined at this time if it is of supernatural origin") still stands, and the Holy See considers this judgment still operative.
Traditionally, there have been one of three determinations with regard to apparitions:
 Constat de supernaturalitate  (Determined to be supernatural) (approved)
 Non constat de supernaturalitate (Not determined to be supernatural) (Neither approved or condemned - not determined - neutral)
 Constat de non supernaturalitate (Determined not to be supernatural) (condemned)

Until such time as the Holy See commission's findings are revealed and approved by the pope, the "not determined" ruling remains in effect.

A commission on Medjugorje established in 2010 by Pope Benedict XVI and chaired by Cardinal Camillo Ruini reportedly voted 13-1 to confirm the supernatural origin of the first seven occurrences of the apparition only. In addition, Commission members also voted to recommend lifting the Holy See ban on official diocesan and parish pilgrimages to Medjugorje and for turning the town's parish Church of St. James into a pontifical shrine under Holy See oversight. The move, the commission indicated, would not signify recognition of the apparitions, but would acknowledge the faith and pastoral needs of the pilgrims while ensuring a proper accounting of donations.

However, Pope Francis also mentioned that The Congregation for the Doctrine of Faith, which reviewed the Ruini report and other material to which it was privy, expressed doubts about both the phenomenon and the Ruini report.
The final decision will be made by the Pope after Polish Archbishop Henryk Hoser has completed his examination of the pastoral situation in Medjugorje.

Authorization of Pilgrimage Made Official
According to Massimiliano Menichetti from Vatican News, on May 12, 2019, Pope Francis authorized pilgrimages to Medjugorje considering the "considerable flow of people who go to Medjugorje and the abundant fruits of grace that have sprung from it." These pilgrimages can now be officially organized by dioceses and parishes even though the authentication of these visions has not been granted. The first sanctioned pilgrimage then took place for five days from August 2–6, 2019. During the pilgrimage, approximately 60,000 young Catholics from 97 different countries took part in the celebration of a youth festival. Fourteen archbishops and bishops and about 700 Catholic priests joined the festivities as well.

Gian Franco Svidercoschi, who co-wrote the book "Gift and Mystery" with Pope John Paul II, and others, suggests that the Church has drawn a distinction between the "apparitions" and Medjugorje as a place of prayer. The general position seems to be that the spiritual fruits are undeniable.

See also

 Our Lady of Medjugorje
 Radio Maria

References

External links
 Phillips, Francis. "Medjugorje is generating what the Devil loves most: disobedience", Catholic Herald, 11 February 2011
 Pullella, Philip. "Pope hints at position on Medjugorje 'apparitions'", Reuters, 9 June 2015 
 Povoledo, Elisabetta. "Church Inquiry May Pit Pope Against a Popular Bosnian Shrine", The New York Times, 16 August 2015

Catholic pilgrimage sites
Catholicism-related controversies
Catholic Church in Bosnia and Herzegovina
Čitluk, Bosnia and Herzegovina